Inkaterra is a Peruvian eco-tourism company.  Founded in 1975 by José Koechlin, the company owns and operates hotels at Machu Picchu Natural Reserve, the southeastern rain forest of the Amazon in Puerto Maldonado, Tambopata, the Sacred Valley, and a restored 16th century manor at Cusco.

References

External links
 

Tourism in Peru